Papyrus 134 (designated as 𝔓134 in the Gregory-Aland numbering system), is a small surviving portion of an early copy of part of the New Testament in Greek. It is a papyrus manuscript of the Gospel of John. The text survives in three discontinuous fragments on one side of a scroll containing parts of verses 1:49,50,51 and 2:1. The manuscript has been assigned paleographically to the third or fourth century.

Location 
𝔓134 is housed at the University of Texas Harry Ransom Center, Austin, TX, in the United States.

Textual Variants 

 1:49: According to the reconstruction of Smith, it reads  (You are King) along with 𝔓75 02 03 032, versus  (You are the King) found in 𝔓66 01 Byz.
 1:51: It contains the Alexandrian reading without  (from now on).
 2:1: According to the reconstruction of Smith, it lacks  (on the day).

History

The manuscript was purchased on the antiquities market by Harold R. Willoughby, professor of early Christianity at the University of Chicago, before 1962. In 1990 it was passed it on to a relative in North Haverhill, NH, who listed it for sale on eBay in 2015. Geoffrey S. Smith, an associate professor and director of University of Texas at Austin's Institute for the Study of Antiquity and Christian Origins in the Department of Religious Studies, saw the listing and arranged for its purchase through the donation of a generous alumnus. It is the first New Testament continuous text that textual scholars have found written on the back of a scroll rather than in a codex, using the blank side of a scroll containing an unidentified Christian text.

See also 

 List of New Testament papyri

References 

New Testament papyri
3rd-century biblical manuscripts
Early Greek manuscripts of the New Testament